The Alfa Romeo 121 was an eight-cylinder, air-cooled, inverted V engine for aircraft use produced in Italy.

Variants
121 R.C.14
121 R.C.20
121 R.C.22

Applications
 Ambrosini S.7

Specifications

See also

References

Further reading

121
1930s aircraft piston engines